Baptist Hospital is a health care facility in Pensacola, Florida. It was the first to operate medical evacuations by helicopter in Florida. The hospital opened in 1951, and is the largest facility in the Baptist Health Care network.

Facilities
Baptist Hospital is currently located near Downtown Pensacola, and the main complex as well as some of the parking is bordered by E, H, Moreno, and Avery Streets. Baptist Hospital is a state-certified Level II trauma center. A new facility is currently being built just southwest of where Brent Lane meets Interstate 110.

Baptist LifeFlight
Baptist LifeFlight transports patients to Baptist Hospital. First established in 1977, it was the third hospital-based aeromedical helicopter program in the United States and the first in Florida. Baptist LifeFlight uses Eurocopter EC 135(N577LF), Eurocopter EC 130(N209LF), Eurocopter EC 130(N506LF), and Eurocopter EC130(N306LF) helicopters based in Florida, Alabama, and Mississippi.

Awards
In 2010, Baptist Hospital was one of 26 hospitals to receive the American College of Cardiology Foundation's Silver Performance Achievement Award for sustaining high standards and excellence in cardiovascular care.

References

External links
 Official website

Hospital buildings completed in 1951
Hospitals in Florida
Baptist hospitals in the United States